"Playaz Club" is the lead single from Rappin' 4-Tay's second album, Don't Fight the Feelin'. The song was produced by Cyrus Esteban and Frank "Franky J" Hudson, Jr. who used a sample of Judy Clay and William Bell's 1968 hit "Private Number".

Released during the summer of 1994, "Playaz Club" became the first of two top 40 hits for Rappin' 4-Tay and was his biggest hit on the Billboard Hot 100, peaking at number 36. The song has become somewhat of a classic West Coast hip hop song  and has appeared on several compilations including recently on Snoop Dogg's 2010 compilation The West Coast Blueprint.

Single track listing

A-Side
"Playaz Club" (Radio Version) – 4:24
"Playaz Club" (Album Version) – 4:24

B-Side
"Playaz Club" (Clean Version) – 4:24
"Playaz Club" (Instrumental) – 4:20

Chart history

1994 singles
1994 songs
Rappin' 4-Tay songs
Chrysalis Records singles